The 2015 Masters (officially the 2015 Dafabet Masters) was a professional non-ranking snooker tournament that took place between 11 and 18 January 2015 at the Alexandra Palace in London, England. It was the 41st staging of the Masters tournament. Shaun Murphy won his first Masters title, beating Neil Robertson 10–2 in the final, the biggest winning margin in a Masters final since Steve Davis whitewashed Mike Hallett 9–0 in 1988. In winning the title, Murphy became the tenth player to win all Triple Crown events at least once. This year's final line up was a repeat of the 2012 tournament, albeit with a different result.

Marco Fu made the 112th official maximum break during his first-round match against Stuart Bingham. This was Fu's third official 147 and the seventh maximum break in the 2014/2015 season. It was the third maximum break in Masters history, after Kirk Stevens's maximum in 1984 and Ding Junhui's in 2007.

Ali Carter played his first match since being given all-clear from lung cancer. He received a standing ovation from the crowd before his first-round encounter with Barry Hawkins, which he won 6–1.

Ronnie O'Sullivan equaled Stephen Hendry's career record of 775 competitive century breaks in his first-round match against Ricky Walden. He did so on the exact date of Hendry's 46th birthday.

Two days later, in the first frame of his quarter-final match against Marco Fu, O'Sullivan set a new record when he compiled the 776th century of his career. In defeating Fu 6–1, O'Sullivan also broke Hendry's record for the most wins in the Masters, setting a new record of 43.

O'Sullivan was the defending champion, but he lost 1–6 against Robertson in the semi-finals.

Field

Defending champion Ronnie O'Sullivan was the number 1 seed with World Champion Mark Selby seeded 2. The remaining places were allocated to players based on the latest world rankings (revision 5) except that Ali Carter was seeded 13, despite being ranked 18, because of illness that had stopped him from playing for an extended period. Players ranked 13 to 15 were seeded 14 to 16 while Graeme Dott, ranked 16, was not invited. The field was the same as in 2014 except that Carter returned for his 9th appearance in place of Mark Davis.

Prize fund
The total prize money of the event was unchanged at £600,000. The breakdown of prize money for this year is shown below:
 Winner: £200,000
 Runner-up: £90,000
 Semi-finals: £50,000
 Quarter-finals: £25,000
 Last 16: £12,500
 Highest break: £10,000
 Total: £600,000

Main draw

Final

Century breaks
Total: 28

 147, 103, 103  Marco Fu
 137  Stephen Maguire
 132, 120, 104  John Higgins
 130  Ali Carter
 128, 127, 117, 100  Neil Robertson
 127, 127, 103, 103, 102  Shaun Murphy
 121  Mark Allen
 120, 100  Mark Selby
 116, 101, 101, 100  Ronnie O'Sullivan
 109  Judd Trump
 104, 104  Joe Perry
 100  Ricky Walden

References

External links
 2015 Dafabet Masters – Pictures by World Snooker at Facebook

2015
2015 in snooker
2015 sports events in London
2015 in English sport
January 2015 sports events in the United Kingdom